The 2022–23 UEFA Nations League D was the fourth and lowest division of the 2022–23 edition of the UEFA Nations League, the third season of the international football competition involving the men's national teams of the 55 member associations of UEFA.

Format
League D consisted of the lowest seven ranked UEFA members from 49–55 in the 2022–23 UEFA Nations League access list, split into two groups (one group of four teams and one group of three teams). Each team played four or six matches within their group, using the home-and-away round-robin format in June (quadruple matchdays) and September 2022 (double matchdays). The winners of both groups were promoted to the 2024–25 UEFA Nations League C.

Teams

Team changes
The following were the team changes of League D from the 2020–21 season:

Seeding
In the 2022–23 access list, UEFA ranked teams based on the 2020–21 Nations League overall ranking. The seeding pots for the league phase were confirmed on 22 September 2021, and were based on the access list ranking.

The draw for the league phase took place at the UEFA headquarters in Nyon, Switzerland on 16 December 2021, 18:00 CET. Group D1 contained two teams from Pot 1 and two teams from Pot 2, while Group D2 contained two teams from Pot 1 and one team from Pot 2. Due to restrictions of excessive travel, any group could contain a maximum of one of the following pairs: Andorra and Kazakhstan, Malta and Kazakhstan.

Groups
The fixture list was confirmed by UEFA on 17 December 2021, the day following the draw.

Times are CEST (UTC+2), as listed by UEFA (local times, if different, are in parentheses).

Group 1

Group 2

Goalscorers

Overall ranking
The seven League D teams were ranked 49th to 55th overall in the 2022–23 UEFA Nations League according to the following rules:
The teams finishing first in the groups were ranked 49th to 50th according to the results of the league phase, not taking into account results against the fourth-placed team.
The teams finishing second in the groups were ranked 51st to 52nd according to the results of the league phase, not taking into account results against the fourth-placed team.
The teams finishing third in the groups were ranked 53rd to 54th according to the results of the league phase, not taking into account results against the fourth-placed team.
The team finishing fourth in Group D1 was ranked 55th.

Euro 2024 qualifying play-offs

Unlike the UEFA Euro 2020 qualifying play-offs, the now-downsized League D will not have its own play-off path. Instead, if any of Leagues A, B, or C have fewer than four teams that did not qualify directly for Euro 2024, the best-ranked group winner of League D will advance to the play-offs (unless that team already qualified for Euro 2024). The remaining spots will be allocated based on the Nations League overall ranking, subject to the restriction that group winners from Leagues A, B, and C cannot face teams from a higher league. Therefore, additional teams from League D can only advance to the play-offs if enough teams from League C qualify directly for Euro 2024.

References

External links

League D